Felipe Klüver Ferreira (born 7 June 2000) is an Uruguayan rower.

Klüver started rowing at age 15 at Club de Remeros Mercedes. He is a graduate of the Mercedes Technical School. He won Uruguay its first world championship medal, a bronze in single lightweight. Together with Bruno Cetraro, he took part in the 2020 Summer Olympics, where they were finalists. He won in the under-23 lightweight class at the 2021 World Indoor Rowing Championship. In Cali, Colombia, at the 2021 Junior Pan American Games, he obtained gold medals in three competitions (M2x, M4x, M4). He was the standard bearer for Uruguay in that event and in at the 2022 South American Games in Asunción, Paraguay. He was under-23 single lightweight world champion in Varese, Italy, 2022.

References

External links
 
 
 

2000 births
Living people
Uruguayan people of German descent
People from Mercedes, Uruguay
Uruguayan male rowers
Rowers at the 2020 Summer Olympics
Olympic rowers of Uruguay
Pan American Games competitors for Uruguay
Rowers at the 2019 Pan American Games
21st-century Uruguayan people
Competitors at the 2022 South American Games